
Polytely (from Greek roots poly- and -tel- meaning "many goals") comprises complex problem-solving situations characterized by the presence of multiple simultaneous goals. These goals may be contradictory or otherwise conflict with one another, requiring prioritisation of desired outcomes.

Polytely is a feature of complex problem-solving that adds difficulty to finding an optimum solution. Funke describes polytely as a feature "not... inherent in a system, but [referring] to certain decisions of the experimenter", especially decisions relating to what goals are to be followed in solving the problem. In the complex problem of nuclear waste disposal, Flüeler cites both trust between states (as a factor in nuclear proliferation: "Some states disarm whilst others re-arm – both do it for the sake of our planet's peace"), and safe and sustainable disposal of nuclear waste as situations where considering in terms of polytely helps elaborate and then balance important but conflicting goals.

See also

Notes

References

External links 
 Decision Making for Complex Socio-technical Systems
 Dynamic systems as tools for analysing human judgement
 Complex problem solving as a mediator between basic cognition and real-world functioning
 Complex Problem Solving: Identity Matching Based on Social Contextual Information
 A study of how individuals solve complex and ill-structured problems
 The role of emotions in complex problem-solving
 Problem solving: its origin
 Complex Problem Solving

Systems theory